was a train station in Tsukigata, Kabato District, Hokkaidō, Japan.

Lines
Hokkaido Railway Company
Sasshō Line

Station layout
The station had a side platform serving one track. The unmanned station building was located a short distance from the platform.

Adjacent stations

History
The station opened on 10 September 1960.

In December 2018, it was announced that the station would be closed on 7 May 2020, along with the rest of the non-electrified section of the Sasshō Line. The actual last service was on 17 April 2020 amid the COVID-19 outbreak.

References

Stations of Hokkaido Railway Company
Railway stations in Hokkaido Prefecture
Railway stations in Japan opened in 1960
Railway stations closed in 2020